Secret Earth is the eleventh studio album by New Zealand noise rock band The Dead C, released on 14 October 2008 through Ba Da Bing Records.

Track listing

Personnel 
The Dead C – production
Michael Morley – instruments
Bruce Russell – instruments
Robbie Yeats – instruments

References

External links 
 

2008 albums
The Dead C albums
Ba Da Bing Records albums